Coraleen Sarah Waddell (born December 15, 1989), popularly known as Cora Waddell, is an American-born Filipino actress, fashion model, and video blogger.

Early life 
Waddell was born in Saipan, Northern Mariana Islands, to Scott Waddell and Francy Roberto. Her family migrated to Orlando, Florida when she was eight. Her family's financial problems became worse when Cora's mother was involved in a vehicle accident, had to undergo emergency surgeries and was hospitalized for a month. The subsequent surgeries and long recovery depleted the family's finances and they were unable to pay the huge medical bills. Waddell was forced to quit college and moved to the Philippines to pursue modeling in 2010. Shortly thereafter, she clinched a modelling contract with Elite Manila Management and a five-year contract with Viva Entertainment. She then appeared in two Viva Films-produced movies Diary ng Panget: The Movie and Talk Back and You're Dead. She made guest appearances on several episodes of TV5's remake of Bagets.

On October 29, 2016, Waddell was introduced as a regular housemate of the seventh regular season of Pinoy Big Brother: Lucky 7, and was dubbed “Dazzling Daughter ng Bulacan”. She became the Seventh Big Placer.

In August 2018, Waddell married businessman Terence Lloyd, with whom she has only one child. The couple divorced in 2021. Her child with him was named Leila Celeste Waddell.

YouTube career 

Prior to creating her own channel, Waddell first appeared on Wil Dasovich's The Life of a Commercial Model (Metrobank Buddy Cora Waddell) vlog in September 2015. Ten months thereafter, she reunited with Wil and starred in the latter's "Baddest Model in the Philippines" vlog with Daniel Marsh, which went viral (10 million views). The Baddest viral video eventually prompted the creation of #VlogSquad.

On July 29, 2016, Waddell posted her first vlog, aptly titled "Vlogging around the Philippines (my first vlog)".

Filmography

Television

Film

Music video appearance 
Waddell starred in Jed Madela's Love Takes Time music video together with Tanner Mata. The music video peaked at #5 on Myx's Daily Top Ten. On June 22, 2017, Waddell announced a cameo in Vini Uehara's music video.

Awards and recognition

Notes

References

External links 
 

1989 births
Living people
Filipino television actresses
Filipino film actresses
Filipino female models
Filipino bloggers
Pinoy Big Brother contestants
Viva Artists Agency
Filipino women bloggers